The Sámi Parliament of Sweden is the representative body for people of Sámi heritage in Sweden based in Kiruna. It acts as an institution of cultural autonomy for the indigenous Sámi people.

History
The Sami Parliament Act, Sametingslag (1992:1433), established the Swedish Sami Parliament as of 1 January 1993. By law, the first official elections were held on 16 May 1993. Its first session was opened by the King of Sweden, Carl XVI Gustaf, on 26 August 1993 in Kiruna. It has 31 representatives, who are elected every four years by general vote. The current chairperson of the Sámi Parliament is Paulus Kuoljak, since 2017. The chairperson is formally assigned by the Swedish Government upon the proposal of the Sami Parliament.

The 2021 Sámediggi Election was held on 16 May 2021, with 9220 people registered as voters, mostly living in Norrbotten or Västerbotten.

Responsibilities
Sweden has taken this active part for two reasons:
 to recognise the Sámi minority as an indigenous people to distinguish it from other minorities;
 to raise the Sámi minority influence which comes into conflict with the European majority democracy system, i.e., the group with the most votes wins.

Voting system
Sámi Parliament is democratically elected and acts as an autonomous authority. Sámi inhabitants have a vote, in addition to the regular elections in Sweden, to elect representatives to the Sámi Parliament if:
 they identify as culturally or ethnically Sámi, and either
 they speak a Sámi language, or
 they have had or have a parent, or grandparent, that speaks or spoke a Sámi language

See also
 List of Chairpersons of the Sami Parliament of Sweden
 Sámi politics
 Sámi Parliament of Finland
 Sámi Parliament of Norway
 Sámi Parliament of Russia

References

External links
Sami Parliament of Sweden

Politics of Sweden
Sámi in Sweden
Parliament
1993 establishments in Sweden
Kiruna